Below is the list of the 121st Maine Senate, which was sworn into office in December 2002 and left office in December 2004.

On November 25, Richard A. Bennett (R-Oxford) and Beverly Daggett (D-Kennebec) were nominated for President of the Maine Senate. After a secret ballot, Daggett was elected Senate President.

State Senators
1 John L. Martin (D) of Eagle Lake, Aroostook County 
2 Richard Kneeland, Easton, Aroostook County 
3 Stephen S. Stanley, Medway, Penobscot County
4 Kevin Shorey, Calais, Washington County 
5 Dennis Damon (D) of Trenton, Hancock County 
6 Edward Youngblood (R) of Brewer, Penobscot County
7 Mary Cathcart (D) of Orono, Penobscot County
8 Paul Davis, Sr., Sangerville, Piscataquis County
9 W. Tom Sawyer, Jr. of Bangor, Penobscot County
10 Betty Lou Mitchell (R) of Etna, Penobscot County
11 Carol Weston (R) of Montville, Waldo County
12 Christine R. Savage of Union, Knox County 
13 Pamela Hatch of Skowhegan, Somerset County 
14 Kenneth Gagnon of Waterville, Kennebec County 
15 Beverly Daggett (D) of Augusta, Kennebec County
16 Christopher G. L. Hall of Bristol, Lincoln County 
17 Chandler Woodcock of Farmington, Franklin County
18 Sharon Treat (D) of Hallowell, Kennebec County
19 Arthur Mayo, of Bath, Sagadahoc County 
20 Kenneth Blais of Litchfield, Kennebec County 
21 Margaret Rotundo (D) of Lewiston, Androscoggin County 
22 Neria R. Douglass of Auburn, Androscoggin County 
23 Beth Edmonds (D) of Freeport, Cumberland County 
24 Bruce Bryant of Dixfield, Oxford County 
25 Richard A. Bennett (R) of Oxford, Oxford County
26 Karl Turner, of Cumberland, Cumberland County
27 Michael Brennan (D) of Portland, Cumberland County
28 Ethan Strimling (D) of Portland, Cumberland County
29 Carolyn M. Gilman of Westbrook, Cumberland County 
30 Lynn Bromley (D) of South Portland, Cumberland County 
31 Peggy Pendleton (D) of Scarborough, Cumberland County
32 Lloyd LaFontain (D) of Biddeford, York County
33 David L. Carpenter, Sanford, York County 
34 Richard Nass of Acton, York County 
35 Kenneth F. Lemont, Kittery, York County

References

Maine legislative sessions
2000s in Maine 
2002 in Maine
2003 in Maine
2004 in Maine